The 1984 World Karate Championships are the 7th edition of the World Karate Championships. They were held in Maastricht, Netherlands from November 21 to November 25, 1984.

Medalists

Men

Women

Medal table

References

External links
 World Karate Federation
 Results
 Results

World Karate Championships
World Karate Championships
World Karate Championships
World Karate Championships
International sports competitions hosted by the Netherlands
Sports competitions in Maastricht
Karate competitions in the Netherlands